Veldwezelt-Hezerwater is a Palaeolithic archaeological site in the municipality of Lanaken in the province of Limburg, Belgium.

See also
Archaeology
Stone Age

References

Bringmans, P.M.M.A., Vermeersch, P.M., Gullentops, F., Groenendijk, A.J., Meijs, E.P.M., de Warrimont, J.-P. & Cordy, J.-M. 2003. Preliminary Excavation Report on the Middle Palaeolithic Valley Settlements at Veldwezelt-Hezerwater (prov. of Limburg). Archeologie in Vlaanderen - Archaeology in Flanders 1999/2000 VII: 9-30.
Bringmans, P.M.M.A., Vermeersch, P.M., Groenendijk, A.J., Meijs, E.P.M., de Warrimont, J.-P. & Gullentops, F. 2004. The Late Saalian Middle Palaeolithic "Lower-Sites" at Veldwezelt-Hezerwater (Limburg - Belgium). In: Le Secrétariat du Congrès (eds), Acts of the XIVth UISPP Congress, University of Liège, Belgium. September 2-8, 2001. Section 5: The Middle Palaeolithic. Oxford. British Archaeological Reports (BAR) International Series 1239: 187-195.

External links
Veldwezelt-Hezerwater

Prehistoric sites in Belgium
Stone Age sites in Europe
Former populated places in Belgium
Archaeological sites in Belgium
Neanderthal sites